James Arthur Baldwin (August 2, 1924 – December 1, 1987) was an American writer. He garnered acclaim for his work across several mediums, including essays, novels, plays, and poems. His first novel, Go Tell It on the Mountain, was published in 1953; decades later, Time magazine included the novel on its list of the 100 best English-language novels released from 1923 to 2005. His first essay collection, Notes of a Native Son, was published in 1955.

Baldwin's work fictionalizes fundamental personal questions and dilemmas amid complex social and psychological pressures. Themes of masculinity, sexuality, race, and class intertwine to create intricate narratives that run parallel with some of the major political movements toward social change in mid-twentieth century America, such as the civil rights movement and the gay liberation movement. Baldwin's protagonists are often but not exclusively African American, and gay and bisexual men frequently feature prominently in his literature. These characters often face internal and external obstacles in their search for social and self-acceptance. Such dynamics are prominent in Baldwin's second novel, Giovanni's Room, which was written in 1956, well before the gay liberation movement.

His reputation has endured since his death and his work has been adapted for the screen to great acclaim. An unfinished manuscript, Remember This House, was expanded and adapted for cinema as the documentary film I Am Not Your Negro (2016), which was nominated for Best Documentary Feature at the 89th Academy Awards. One of his novels, If Beale Street Could Talk, was adapted into the Academy Award– winning film of the same name in 2018, directed and produced by Barry Jenkins.

In addition to writing, Baldwin was also a well-known, and controversial, public figure and orator, especially during the civil rights movement in the United States.

Early life

Birth and family
Baldwin was born as James Arthur Jones to Emma Berdis Jones on August 2, 1924, at Harlem Hospital in New York City. Baldwin was born out of wedlock. Jones never revealed to Baldwin who his biological father was. According to Anna Malaika Tubbs in her account of the mothers of prominent civil rights figures, some rumors stated that James Baldwin's father suffered from drug addiction or that he died, but that in any case, Jones undertook to care for her son as a single mother. A native of Deal Island, Maryland, where she was born in 1903, Emma Jones was one of the many who fled racial segregation in the South during the Great Migration. She arrived in Harlem at 19 years old.

In 1927, Jones married David Baldwin, a laborer and Baptist preacher. David Baldwin was born in Bunkie, Louisiana, and preached in New Orleans, but left the South for Harlem in 1919. How David and Emma met is uncertain, but in James Baldwin's semi-autobiographical Go Tell It on the Mountain, the characters based on the two are introduced by the man's sister, who is a friend of the woman. Emma Baldwin would bear eight children with her husband—George, Barbara, Wilmer, David Jr. (named for James's father and deceased half-brother), Gloria, Ruth, Elizabeth, and Paula—and raise them with her eldest James, who took his stepfather's last name. James rarely wrote or spoke of his mother. When he did, he made clear that he admired and loved her, often through reference to her loving smile. Baldwin moved several times in his early life but always to different addresses in Harlem. Harlem was still a mixed-race area of the city in the incipient days of the Great Migration; tenements and penury featured equally throughout the urban landscape.

David Baldwin was many years Emma's senior; he may have been born before Emancipation in 1863, although James did not know exactly how old his stepfather was. David's mother, Barbara, was born enslaved and lived with the Baldwins in New York before her death when James was seven. David also had a light-skinned half-brother that his mother's erstwhile enslaver had fathered on her, and a sister named Barbara, whom James and others in the family called "Taunty". David's father and James's paternal grandfather had also been born enslaved. David had been married earlier, begetting a daughter, who was as old as Emma when the two were wed, and at least two sons―David, who would die in jail, and Sam, who was eight years James's senior, lived with the Baldwins in New York for a time, and once saved James from drowning.

James referred to his stepfather simply as his "father" throughout his life, but David Sr. and James shared an extremely difficult relationship, nearly rising to physical fights on several occasions. "They fought because [James] read books, because he liked movies, because he had white friends", all of which, David Baldwin thought, threatened James's "salvation", Baldwin biographer David Adams Leeming wrote. David Baldwin also hated white people and "his devotion to God was mixed with a hope that God would take revenge on them for him", wrote another Baldwin biographer James Campbell. During the 1920s and 1930s, David worked at a soft-drinks bottling factory, though he was eventually laid off from this job, and, as his anger entered his sermons, he became less in demand as a preacher. David Baldwin sometimes took out his anger on his family, and the children became fearful of him, tensions to some degree balanced by the love lavished on them by their mother. David Baldwin grew paranoid near the end of his life. He was committed to a mental asylum in 1943 and died of tuberculosis on July 29 of that year, the same day Emma gave birth to their last child, Paula. James Baldwin, at his mother's urging, had visited his dying stepfather the day before, and came to something of a posthumous reconciliation with him in his essay, "Notes of a Native Son", in which he wrote, "in his outrageously demanding and protective way, he loved his children, who were black like him and menaced like him". David Baldwin's funeral was held on James's 19th birthday, around the same time that the Harlem riot broke out.

As the oldest child, James worked part-time from an early age to help support his family. He was molded not only by the difficult relationships in his own household but by the results of poverty and discrimination he saw all around him. As he grew up, friends he sat next to in church would turn away to drugs, crime, or prostitution. In what Tubbs found not only a commentary on his own life but on the Black experience in America, Baldwin once wrote, "I never had a childhood ... I did not have any human identity ... I was born dead."

Education and preaching
Baldwin wrote comparatively little about events at school. At five years old, Baldwin began school at Public School 24 on 128th Street in Harlem. The principal of the school was Gertrude E. Ayer, the first Black principal in the city, who recognized Baldwin's precocity and encouraged him in his research and writing pursuits, as did some of his teachers, who recognized he had a brilliant mind. Ayer stated that James Baldwin got his writing talent from his mother, whose notes to school were greatly admired by the teachers, and that her son also learned to write like an angel, albeit an avenging one. By fifth grade, not yet a teenager, Baldwin had read some of Fyodor Dostoyevsky's works, Harriet Beecher Stowe's Uncle Tom's Cabin, and Charles Dickens' A Tale of Two Cities, beginning a lifelong interest in Dickens' work. Baldwin wrote a song that earned New York Mayor Fiorello La Guardia's praise in a letter that La Guardia sent to Baldwin. Baldwin also won a prize for a short story that was published in a church newspaper. Baldwin's teachers recommended that he go to a public library on 135th Street in Harlem, a place that would become a sanctuary for Baldwin and where he would make a deathbed request for his papers and effects to be deposited.

It was at P.S. 24 that Baldwin met Orilla "Bill" Miller, a young white schoolteacher from the Midwest whom Baldwin named as partially the reason that he "never really managed to hate white people". Among other outings, Miller took Baldwin to see an all-Black rendition of Orson Welles's take on Macbeth in Lafayette Theatre, from which flowed a lifelong desire to succeed as a playwright. David was reluctant to let his stepson go to the theatre—he saw stage works as sinful and was suspicious of Miller—but his wife insisted, reminding him of the importance of Baldwin's education. Miller later directed the first play that Baldwin ever wrote.

After P.S. 24, Baldwin entered Harlem's Frederick Douglass Junior High School. At Douglass Junior High, Baldwin met two important influences. The first was Herman W. "Bill" Porter, a Black Harvard graduate. Porter was the faculty advisor to the school's newspaper, the Douglass Pilot, where Baldwin would later be the editor. Porter took Baldwin to the library on 42nd Street to research a piece that would turn into Baldwin's first published essay titled "Harlem—Then and Now", which appeared in the autumn 1937 issue of Douglass Pilot. The second of these influences from his time at Douglass was the renowned poet of the Harlem Renaissance, Countee Cullen. Cullen taught French and was a literary advisor in the English department. Baldwin later remarked that he "adored" Cullen's poetry, and said he found the spark of his dream to live in France in Cullen's early impression on him. Baldwin graduated from Frederick Douglass Junior High in 1938.

In 1938, Baldwin applied to and was accepted at De Witt Clinton High School in the Bronx, a predominantly white, predominantly Jewish school, matriculating there that fall. At De Witt Clinton, Baldwin worked on the school's magazine, the Magpie with Richard Avedon, who went on to become a noted photographer, and Emile Capouya and Sol Stein, who would both become renowned publishers. Baldwin did interviews and editing at the magazine and published a number of poems and other writings. Baldwin finished at De Witt Clinton in 1941. His yearbook listed his ambition as "novelist-playwright". Baldwin's motto in his yearbook was: "Fame is the spur and—ouch!"

During his high school years, uncomfortable with the fact that, unlike many of his peers, he was attracted to men rather than women, Baldwin sought refuge in religion. He first joined the now-demolished Mount Calvary of the Pentecostal Faith Church on Lenox Avenue in 1937, but followed the preacher there, Bishop Rose Artemis Horn, who was affectionately called Mother Horn, when she left to preach at Fireside Pentecostal Assembly. At 14, "Brother Baldwin", as Baldwin was called, first took to Fireside's altar. It was at Fireside Pentecostal, during his mostly extemporaneous sermons, that Baldwin "learned that he had authority as a speaker and could do things with a crowd", says biographer Campbell. Baldwin delivered his final sermon at Fireside Pentecostal in 1941. Baldwin later wrote in the essay "Down at the Cross" that the church "was a mask for self-hatred and despair ... salvation stopped at the church door". He related that he had a rare conversation with David Baldwin "in which they had really spoken to one another", with his stepfather asking, "You'd rather write than preach, wouldn't you?"

Later years in New York
Baldwin left school in 1941 to earn money to help support his family. He secured a job helping to build a United States Army depot in New Jersey. In the middle of 1942 Emile Capouya helped Baldwin get a job laying tracks for the military in Belle Mead, New Jersey. The two lived in Rocky Hill and commuted to Belle Mead. In Belle Mead, Baldwin came to know the face of a prejudice that deeply frustrated and angered him and that he named the partial cause of his later emigration out of America. Baldwin's fellow white workmen, who mostly came from the South, derided him for what they saw as his "uppity" ways and his lack of "respect". Baldwin's sharp, ironic wit particularly upset the white Southerners he met in Belle Mead.

In an incident that Baldwin described in "Notes of a Native Son", Baldwin went to a restaurant in Princeton called the Balt where, after a long wait, Baldwin was told that "colored boys" weren't served there. Then, on his last night in New Jersey, in another incident also memorialized in "Notes of a Native Son", Baldwin and a friend went to a diner after a movie only to be told that Black people were not served there. Infuriated, he went to another restaurant, expecting to be denied service once again. When that denial of service came, humiliation and rage heaved up to the surface and Baldwin hurled the nearest object at hand—a water mug—at the waiter, missing her and shattering the mirror behind her. Baldwin and his friend narrowly escaped.

During these years, Baldwin was torn between his desire to write and his need to provide for his family. He took a succession of menial jobs, and feared becoming like his stepfather, who had been unable to properly provide for his family. Fired from the track-laying job, he returned to Harlem in June 1943 to live with his family after taking a meat-packing job. Baldwin would lose the meat-packing job too after falling asleep at the plant. He became listless and unstable, drifting from this odd job to that. Baldwin drank heavily, and endured the first of his nervous breakdowns.

Beauford Delaney helped Baldwin cast off his melancholy. In the year before he left De Witt Clinton and at Capuoya's urging, Baldwin had met Delaney, a modernist painter, in Greenwich Village. Delaney would become Baldwin's long-time friend and mentor, and helped demonstrate to Baldwin that a Black man could make his living in art. Moreover, when World War II bore down on the United States the winter after Baldwin left De Witt Clinton, the Harlem that Baldwin knew was atrophying—no longer the bastion of a Renaissance, the community grew more economically isolated and Baldwin considered his prospects there bleak. This led Baldwin to move to Greenwich Village, where Beauford Delaney lived and a place by which he had been fascinated since at least fifteen.

Baldwin lived in several locations in Greenwich Village, first with Delaney, then with a scattering of other friends in the area. He took a job at the Calypso Restaurant, an unsegregated eatery famous for the parade of prominent Black people who dined there. At Calypso, Baldwin worked under Trinidadian restauranteur Connie Williams, whom Delaney had introduced him to. While working at Calypso, Baldwin continued to explore his sexuality, came out to Capouya and another friend, and frequent Calypso guest, Stan Weir. He also had numerous one-night stands with various men, and several relationships with women. Baldwin's major love during these years in the Village was an ostensibly straight Black man named Eugene Worth. Worth introduced Baldwin to the Young People's Socialist League and Baldwin became a Trotskyist for a brief period. Baldwin never expressed his desire for Worth, and Worth died by suicide after jumping from the George Washington Bridge in 1946. In 1944 Baldwin met Marlon Brando, whom he was also attracted to, at a theater class in The New School. The two became fast friends, maintaining a closeness that endured through the Civil Rights Movement and long after. Later, in 1945, Baldwin started a literary magazine called The Generation with Claire Burch, who was married to Brad Burch, Baldwin's classmate from De Witt Clinton. Baldwin's relationship with the Burches soured in the 1950s but was resurrected near the end of his life.

Near the end of 1944 Baldwin met Richard Wright, who had published Native Son several years earlier. Baldwin's main designs for that initial meeting were trained on convincing Wright of the quality of an early manuscript for what would become Go Tell It On The Mountain, then called "Crying Holy". Wright liked the manuscript and encouraged his editors to consider Baldwin's work, but an initial $500 advance from Harper & Brothers dissipated with no book to show for the trouble. Harper eventually declined to publish the book at all. Nonetheless, Baldwin sent letters to Wright regularly in the subsequent years and would reunite with Wright in Paris in 1948, though their relationship turned for the worse soon after the Paris reunion.

In these years in the Village, Baldwin made a number of connections in the liberal New York literary establishment, primarily through Worth: Sol Levitas at The New Leader, Randall Jarrell at The Nation, Elliot Cohen and Robert Warshow at Commentary, and Philip Rahv at Partisan Review. Baldwin wrote many reviews for The New Leader, but was published for the first time in The Nation in a 1947 review of Maxim Gorki's Best Short Stories. Only one of Baldwin's reviews from this era made it into his later essay collection The Price of the Ticket: a sharply ironic assay of Ross Lockridge's Raintree Countree that Baldwin wrote for The New Leader. Baldwin's first essay, "The Harlem Ghetto", was published a year later in Commentary and explored anti-Semitism among Black Americans. His conclusion in "Harlem Ghetto" was that Harlem was a parody of white America, with white American anti-Semitism included. Jewish people were also the main group of white people that Black Harlem dwellers met, so Jews became a kind of synecdoche for all that the Black people in Harlem thought of white people. Baldwin published his second essay in The New Leader, riding a mild wave of excitement over "Harlem Ghetto": in "Journey to Atlanta", Baldwin uses the diary recollections of his younger brother David, who had gone to Atlanta as part of a singing group, to unleash a lashing of irony and scorn on the South, white radicals, and ideology itself. This essay, too, was well received.

Baldwin tried to write another novel, Ignorant Armies, plotted in the vein of Native Son with a focus on a scandalous murder, but no final product materialized and his strivings toward a novel remained unsated. Baldwin spent two months out of summer 1948 at Shanks Village, a writer's colony in Woodstock, New York. He then published his first work of fiction, a short story called "Previous Condition", in the October 1948 issue of Commentary, about a 20-something Black man who is evicted from his apartment, the apartment a metaphor for white society.

Career

Life in Paris (1948–1957)
Disillusioned by American prejudice against Black people, as well as wanting to see himself and his writing outside of an African-American context, he left the United States at the age of 24 to settle in Paris. Baldwin wanted not to be read as "merely a Negro; or, even, merely a Negro writer." He also hoped to come to terms with his sexual ambivalence and escape the hopelessness that many young African-American men like himself succumbed to in New York.

In 1948, with $1,500 ($ today) in funding from a Rosenwald Fellowship, Baldwin attempted a photography and essay book titled Unto the Dying Lamb with a photographer friend named Theodore Pelatowski, whom Baldwin met through Richard Avedon. The book was intended as both a catalog of churches and an exploration of religiosity in Harlem, but it was never finished. The Rosenwald money did, however, grant Baldwin the prospect of consummating a desire he held for several years running: moving to France. This he did: after saying his goodbyes to his mother and younger siblings, with forty dollars to his name, Baldwin flew from New York to Paris on November 11, 1948, having given most of the scholarship funds to his mother. Baldwin would give various explanations for leaving America—sex, Calvinism, an intense sense of hostility he feared would turn inward—but most of all, his race: the feature of his existence that had theretofore exposed him to a lengthy catalog of humiliations. He hoped for a more peaceable existence in Paris.

In Paris, Baldwin was soon involved in the cultural radicalism of the Left Bank. He started to publish his work in literary anthologies, notably Zero which was edited by his friend Themistocles Hoetis and which had already published essays by Richard Wright.

Baldwin spent nine years living in Paris, mostly in Saint-Germain-des-Prés, with various excursions to Switzerland, Spain, and back to the United States. Baldwin's time in Paris was itinerant: he stayed with various friends around the city and in various hotels. Most notable of these lodgings was Hôtel Verneuil, a hotel in Saint-Germain that had collected a motley crew of struggling expatriates, mostly writers. This Verneuil circle spawned numerous friendships that Baldwin relied upon in rough periods. Baldwin was also continuously poor during his time in Paris, with only momentary respites from that condition. In his early years in Saint-Germain, Baldwin acquainted himself with Otto Friedrich, Mason Hoffenberg, Asa Benveniste, Themistocles Hoetis, Jean-Paul Sartre, Simone de Beauvoir, Max Ernst, Truman Capote, and Stephen Spender, among many others. Baldwin also met Lucien Happersberger, a Swiss boy, seventeen years old at the time of their first meeting, who came to France in search of excitement. Happersberger became Baldwin's lover, especially in Baldwin's first two years in France, and Baldwin's near-obsession for some time after. Baldwin and Happersberger would remain friends for the next thirty-nine years. Though his time in Paris was not easy, Baldwin did escape the aspects of American life that most terrified him—especially the "daily indignities of racism", per biographer James Campbell. According to Baldwin's friend and biographer David Leeming: "Baldwin seemed at ease in his Paris life; Jimmy Baldwin the aesthete and lover reveled in the Saint-Germain ambiance."

In his early years in Paris prior to Go Tell It on the Mountains publication, Baldwin wrote several notable works. "The Negro in Paris", published first in The Reporter, explored Baldwin's perception of an incompatibility between Black Americans and Black Africans in Paris, as Black Americans had faced a "depthless alienation from oneself and one's people" that was mostly unknown to Parisian Africans. He also wrote "The Preservation of Innocence", which traced the violence against homosexuals in American life to the protracted adolescence of America as a society. In the magazine Commentary, he published "Too Little, Too Late", an essay on Black American literature, and "The Death of the Prophet", a short story that grew out of Baldwin's earlier writings for Go Tell It on The Mountain. In the latter work, Baldwin employs a character named Johnnie to trace his bouts of depression to his inability to resolve the questions of filial intimacy emanating from Baldwin's relationship with his stepfather. In December 1949, Baldwin was arrested and jailed for receiving stolen goods after an American friend brought him bedsheets that the friend had taken from another Paris hotel. When the charges were dismissed several days later, to the laughter of the courtroom, Baldwin wrote of the experience in his essay "Equal in Paris", also published in Commentary in 1950. In the essay, he expressed his surprise and bewilderment at how he was no longer a "despised black man" but simply an American, no different than the white American friend who stole the sheet and with whom he had been arrested.

In these years in Paris, Baldwin also published two of his three scathing critiques of Richard Wright—"Everybody's Protest Novel" in 1949 and "Many Thousands Gone" in 1951. Baldwin's critique of Wright is an extension of his disapprobation toward protest literature. Per biographer David Leeming, Baldwin despised protest literature because it is "concerned with theories and with the categorization of human beings, and however brilliant the theories or accurate the categorizations, they fail because they deny life." Protest writing cages humanity, but, according to Baldwin, "only within this web of ambiguity, paradox, this hunger, danger, darkness, can we find at once ourselves and the power that will free us from ourselves." Baldwin took Wright's Native Son and Stowe's Uncle Tom's Cabin, both erstwhile favorites of Baldwin's, as paradigmatic examples of the protest novel's problem. The treatment of Wright's Bigger Thomas by socially earnest white people near the end of Native Son was, for Baldwin, emblematic of white Americans' presumption that for Black people "to become truly human and acceptable, [they] must first become like us. This assumption once accepted, the Negro in America can only acquiesce in the obliteration of his own personality." In these two essays, Baldwin came to articulate what would become a theme in his work: that white racism toward Black Americans was refracted through self-hatred and self-denial—"One may say that the Negro in America does not really exist except in the darkness of [white] minds. [...] Our dehumanization of the Negro then is indivisible from our dehumanization of ourselves." Baldwin's relationship with Wright was tense but cordial after the essays, although Baldwin eventually ceased to regard Wright as a mentor. Meanwhile, "Everybody's Protest Novel" had earned Baldwin the label "the most promising young Negro writer since Richard Wright."

Beginning in the winter of 1951, Baldwin and Happersberger took several trips to Loèches-les-Bains in Switzerland, where Happersberger's family owned a small chateau. By the time of the first trip, Happersberger had then entered a heterosexual relationship but grew worried for his friend Baldwin and offered to take Baldwin to the Swiss village. Baldwin's time in the village gave form to his essay "Stranger in the Village", published in Harper's Magazine in October 1953. In that essay, Baldwin described some unintentional mistreatment and offputting experiences at the hands of Swiss villagers who possessed a racial innocence few Americans could attest to. Baldwin explored how the bitter history shared between Black and white Americans had formed an indissoluble web of relations that changed both races: "No road whatever will lead Americans back to the simplicity of this European village where white men still have the luxury of looking on me as a stranger."

Beauford Delaney's arrival in France in 1953 marked "the most important personal event in Baldwin's life" that year, according to biographer David Leeming. Around the same time, Baldwin's circle of friends shifted away from primarily white bohemians toward a coterie of Black American expatriates: Baldwin grew close to dancer Bernard Hassell; spent significant amounts of time at Gordon Heath's club in Paris; regularly listened to Bobby Short and Inez Cavanaugh's performances at their respective haunts around the city; met Maya Angelou for the first time in these years as she partook in various European renditions of Porgy and Bess; and occasionally met with writers Richard Gibson and Chester Himes, composer Howard Swanson, and even Richard Wright. In 1954 Baldwin took a fellowship at the MacDowell writer's colony in New Hampshire to help the process of writing of a new novel and won a Guggenheim Fellowship. Also in 1954, Baldwin published the three-act play The Amen Corner which features the preacher Sister Margaret—a fictionalized Mother Horn from Baldwin's time at Fireside Pentecostal—struggling with a difficult inheritance and alienation from herself and her loved ones on account of her religious fervor. Baldwin spent several weeks in Washington, D.C. and particularly around Howard University while he collaborated with Owen Dodson for the premiere of The Amen Corner, returning to Paris in October 1955.

Baldwin committed himself to a return to the United States in 1957, so he set about in early 1956 to enjoy what would be his last year in France. He became friends with Norman and Adele Mailer, was recognized by the National Institute of Arts and Letters with a grant, and was set to publish Giovanni's Room. Nevertheless, Baldwin sank deeper into an emotional wreckage. In the summer of 1956—after a seemingly failed affair with a Black musician named Arnold, Baldwin's first serious relationship since Happersberger—Baldwin overdosed on sleeping pills in a suicide attempt. He regretted the attempt almost instantly and called a friend who had him regurgitate the pills before the doctor arrived. Baldwin went on to attend the Congress of Black Writers and Artists in September 1956, a conference he found disappointing in its perverse reliance on European themes while nonetheless purporting to extol African originality.

Literary career 
Baldwin's first published work, a review of the writer Maxim Gorky, appeared in The Nation in 1947. He continued to publish in that magazine at various times in his career and was serving on its editorial board at his death in 1987.

1950s 
In 1953, Baldwin's first novel, Go Tell It on the Mountain, a semi-autobiographical bildungsroman was published. He began writing it when he was only seventeen and first published it in Paris. His first collection of essays, Notes of a Native Son appeared two years later. He continued to experiment with literary forms throughout his career, publishing poetry and plays as well as the fiction and essays for which he was known.

Baldwin's second novel, Giovanni's Room, caused great controversy when it was first published in 1956 due to its explicit homoerotic content. Baldwin again resisted labels with the publication of this work. Despite the reading public's expectations that he would publish works dealing with African American experiences, Giovanni's Room is predominantly about white characters.

Go Tell It on the Mountain (1953) 

Baldwin sent the manuscript for Go Tell It on the Mountain from Paris to New York publishing house Alfred A. Knopf on February 26, 1952, and Knopf expressed interest in the novel several months later. To settle the terms of his association with Knopf, Baldwin sailed back to the United States on the SS Île de France in April, where Themistocles Hoetis and Dizzy Gillespie were coincidentally also voyaging—his conversations with both on the ship were extensive. After his arrival in New York, Baldwin spent much of the next three months with his family, whom he had not seen in almost three years. Baldwin grew particularly close to his younger brother, David Jr., and served as best man at David's wedding on June 27. Meanwhile, Baldwin agreed to rewrite parts of Go Tell It on the Mountain in exchange for a $250 advance ($ today) and a further $750 ($ today) paid when the final manuscript was completed. When Knopf accepted the revision in July, they sent the remainder of the advance, and Baldwin was soon to have his first published novel. In the interim, Baldwin published excerpts of the novel in two publications: one excerpt was published as "Exodus" in American Mercury and the other as "Roy's Wound" in New World Writing. Baldwin set sail back to Europe on August 28 and Go Tell It on the Mountain was published in May 1953.

Go Tell It on the Mountain was the product of Baldwin's years of work and exploration since his first attempt at a novel in 1938. In rejecting the ideological manacles of protest literature and the presupposition he thought inherent to such works that "in Negro life there exists no tradition, no field of manners, no possibility of ritual or intercourse", Baldwin sought in Go Tell It on the Mountain to emphasize that the core of the problem was "not that the Negro has no tradition but that there has as yet arrived no sensibility sufficiently profound and tough to make this tradition articulate." Baldwin biographer David Leeming draws parallels between Baldwin's undertaking in Go Tell It on the Mountain and James Joyce's endeavor in A Portrait of the Artist as a Young Man: to "encounter for the millionth time the reality of experience and to forge in the smithy of my soul the uncreated conscience of my race." Baldwin himself drew parallels between Joyce's flight from his native Ireland and his own run from Harlem, and Baldwin read Joyce's tome in Paris in 1950, but in Baldwin's Go Tell It on the Mountain, it would be the Black American "uncreated conscience" at the heart of the project.

The novel is a bildungsroman that peers into the inward struggles of protagonist John Grimes, the illegitimate son of Elizabeth Grimes, to claim his own soul as it lies on the "threshing floor"—a clear allusion to another John, the Baptist born of another Elizabeth. John's struggle is a metaphor for Baldwin's own struggle between escaping the history and heritage that made him, awful though it may be, and plunging deeper into that heritage, to the bottom of his people's sorrows, before he can shuffle off his psychic chains, "climb the mountain", and free himself. John's family members and most of the characters in the novel are blown north in the winds of the Great Migration in search of the American Dream and all are stifled. Florence, Elizabeth, and Gabriel are denied love's reach because racism assured that they could not muster the kind of self-respect that love requires. Racism drives Elizabeth's lover, Richard, to suicide—Richard will not be the last Baldwin character to die thus for that same reason. Florence's lover Frank is destroyed by searing self-hatred of his own Blackness. Gabriel's abuse of the women in his life is downstream from his society's emasculation of him, with mealy-mouthed religiosity only a hypocritical cover.

The phrase "in my father's house" and various similar formulations appear throughout Go Tell It on the Mountain, and was even an early title for the novel. The house is a metaphor at several levels of generality: for his own family's apartment in Harlem, for Harlem taken as a whole, for America and its history, and for the "deep heart's core". John's departure from the agony that reigned in his father's house, particularly the historical sources of the family's privations, came through a conversion experience. "Who are these? Who are they" John cries out when he sees a mass of faces as he descends to the threshing floor: "They were the despised and rejected, the wretched and the spat upon, the earth's offscouring; and he was in their company, and they would swallow up his soul." John wants desperately to escape the threshing floor, but "[t]hen John saw the Lord" and "a sweetness" filled him. The midwife of John's conversion is Elisha, the voice of love that had followed him throughout the experience, and whose body filled John with "a wild delight". Thus comes the wisdom that would define Baldwin's philosophy: per biographer David Leeming: "salvation from the chains and fetters—the self-hatred and the other effects—of historical racism could come only from love."

Notes of a Native Son (1955) 

It was Baldwin's friend from high school, Sol Stein, who encouraged Baldwin to write an essay collection reflecting on his work thus far. Baldwin was reluctant, saying he was "too young to publish my memoirs." Stein persisted in his exhortations to his friend Baldwin, and Notes of a Native Son was published in 1955. The book contained practically all the major themes that would continue to run through Baldwin's work: searching for self when racial myths cloud reality; accepting an inheritance ("the conundrum of color is the inheritance of every American"); claiming a birthright ("my birthright was vast, connecting me to all that lives, and to everyone, forever"); the artist's loneliness; love's urgency. All the essays in Notes were published between 1948 and 1955 in Commentary, The New Leader, Partisan Review, The Reporter, and Harper's Magazine. The essays rely on autobiographical detail to convey Baldwin's arguments, as all of Baldwin's work does. Notes was Baldwin's first introduction to many white Americans and became their reference point for his work: Baldwin often got asked, "Why don't you write more essays like the ones in Notes of a Native Son?". The collection's title alludes to both Richard Wright's Native Son and the work of one of Baldwin's favorite writers, Henry James's Notes of a Son and Brother.

Notes of a Native Son is divided into three parts: the first part deals with Black identity as artist and human; the second part negotiates with Black life in America, including what is sometimes considered Baldwin's best essay, the titular "Notes of a Native Son"; the final part takes the expatriate's perspective, looking at American society from beyond its shores. Part One of Notes features "Everybody's Protest Novel" and "Many Thousands Gone", along with "Carmen Jones: The Dark Is Light Enough", a 1955 review of Carmen Jones written for Commentary where Baldwin at once extols the sight of an all-Black cast on the silver screen and laments the film's myths about Black sexuality. Part Two reprints "The Harlem Ghetto" and "Journey to Atlanta" as prefaces for "Notes of a Native Son". In "Notes of a Native Son", Baldwin attempts to come to terms with his racial and filial inheritances. Part Three contains "Equal in Paris", "Stranger in the Village", "Encounter on the Seine", and "A Question of Identity". Writing from the expatriate's perspective, Part Three is the sector of Baldwin's corpus that most closely mirrors Henry James's methods: hewing out of one's distance and detachment from the homeland a coherent idea of what it means to be American.

Throughout Notes, when Baldwin is not speaking in first-person, Baldwin takes the view of white Americans. For example, in "The Harlem Ghetto", Baldwin writes: "what it means to be a Negro in America can perhaps be suggested by the myths we perpetuate about him." This earned some quantity of scorn from reviewers: in a review for The New York Times Book Review, Langston Hughes lamented that "Baldwin's viewpoints are half American, half Afro-American, incompletely fused." Some others were nonplussed by the handholding of white audiences, which Baldwin himself would criticize in later works. Nonetheless, most acutely in this stage in his career, Baldwin wanted to escape the rigid categories of protest literature and he viewed adopting a white point-of-view as a good method of doing so.

Giovanni's Room (1956) 

Shortly after returning to Paris, Baldwin got word from Dial Press that Giovanni's Room had been accepted for publication. Baldwin sent the final manuscript for the book to his editor, James Silberman, on April 8, 1956, and the book was published that autumn. 

In the novel, the protagonist David is in Paris while his fiancé Hella is in Spain. David meets the titular Giovanni at the bar that Guillaume owns; the two grow increasingly intimate and David eventually finds his way to Giovanni's room. 

David is confused by his intense feelings for Giovanni and has sex with a woman in the spur of the moment to reaffirm his sexuality. Meanwhile, Giovanni begins to prostitute himself and finally commits a murder for which he is guillotined. 

David's tale is one of love's inhibition: he cannot "face love when he finds it", writes biographer James Campbell. The novel features a traditional theme: the clash between the restraints of puritanism and the impulse for adventure, emphasizing the loss of innocence that results. The inspiration for the murder part of the novel's plot is an event dating from 1943 to 1944. 

A Columbia University undergraduate named Lucien Carr murdered an older, homosexual man, David Kammerer, who made sexual advances on Carr. The two were walking near the banks of the Hudson River when Kammerrer made a pass at Carr, leading Carr to stab Kammerer and dump Kammerer's body in the river. 

To Baldwin's relief, the reviews of Giovanni's Room were positive, and his family did not criticize the subject matter.

Return to New York
Even from Paris, Baldwin heard the whispers of a rising Civil Rights Movement in his homeland: in May 1954, the United States Supreme Court ordered schools to desegregate "with all deliberate speed"; in August 1955 the racist murder of Emmett Till in Money, Mississippi, and the subsequent acquittal of his killers would burn in Baldwin's mind until he wrote Blues for Mister Charlie; in December Rosa Parks was arrested for refusing to give up her seat on a Montgomery bus; and in February 1956 Autherine Lucy was admitted to the University of Alabama before being expelled when whites rioted. Meanwhile, Baldwin was increasingly burdened by the sense that he was wasting time in Paris. Baldwin began planning a return to the United States in hopes of writing a biography of Booker T. Washington, which he then called Talking at the Gates. Baldwin also received commissions to write a review of Daniel Guérin's Negroes on the March and J. C. Furnas's Goodbye to Uncle Tom for The Nation, as well as to write about William Faulkner and American racism for Partisan Review.

The first project became "The Crusade of Indignation", published in July 1956. Baldwin suggests that the portrait of Black life in Uncle Tom's Cabin "has set the tone for the attitude of American whites towards Negroes for the last one hundred years", and that, given the novel's popularity, this portrait has led to a unidimensional characterization of Black Americans that does not capture the full scope of Black humanity. The second project turned into the essay "William Faulkner and Desegregation". The essay was inspired by Faulkner's March 1956 comment during an interview that he was sure to enlist himself with his fellow white Mississippians in a war over desegregation "even if it meant going out into the streets and shooting Negroes". For Baldwin, Faulkner represented the "go slow" mentality on desegregation that tries to wrestle with the Southerner's peculiar dilemma: the South "clings to two entirely antithetical doctrines, two legends, two histories"; the southerner is "the proud citizen of a free society and, on the other hand, committed to a society that has not yet dared to free itself of the necessity of naked and brutal oppression." Faulkner asks for more time but "the time [...] does not exist. [...] There is never time in the future in which we will work out our salvation."

Baldwin initially intended to complete Another Country before returning to New York in the fall of 1957 but progress on the novel was trudging along, so he ultimately decided to go back to the United States sooner. Beauford Delaney was particularly upset about Baldwin's departure. Delaney had started to drink a lot and was in the incipient stages of mental deterioration, now complaining about hearing voices. Nonetheless, after a brief visit with Édith Piaf, Baldwin set sail for New York in July 1957.

1960s 
Baldwin's third and fourth novels, Another Country (1962) and Tell Me How Long the Train's Been Gone (1968), are sprawling, experimental works dealing with Black and white characters, as well as with heterosexual, gay, and bisexual characters.

Baldwin's lengthy essay "Down at the Cross" (frequently called The Fire Next Time after the title of the 1963 book in which it was published) similarly showed the seething discontent of the 1960s in novel form. The essay was originally published in two oversized issues of The New Yorker and landed Baldwin on the cover of Time magazine in 1963 while he was touring the South speaking about the restive Civil Rights Movement. Around the time of publication of The Fire Next Time, Baldwin became a known spokesperson for civil rights and a celebrity noted for championing the cause of Black Americans. He frequently appeared on television and delivered speeches on college campuses. The essay talked about the uneasy relationship between Christianity and the burgeoning Black Muslim movement. After publication, several Black nationalists criticized Baldwin for his conciliatory attitude. They questioned whether his message of love and understanding would do much to change race relations in America. The book was consumed by whites looking for answers to the question: What do Black Americans really want? Baldwin's essays never stopped articulating the anger and frustration felt by real-life Black Americans with more clarity and style than any other writer of his generation.

1970s and 1980s 
Baldwin's next book-length essay, No Name in the Street (1972), also discussed his own experience in the context of the later 1960s, specifically the assassinations of three of his personal friends: Medgar Evers, Malcolm X, and Martin Luther King, Jr.

Baldwin's writings of the 1970s and 1980s were largely overlooked by critics, although they have received increasing attention in recent years. Several of his essays and interviews of the 1980s discuss homosexuality and homophobia with fervor and forthrightness. Eldridge Cleaver's harsh criticism of Baldwin in Soul on Ice and elsewhere and Baldwin's return to southern France contributed to the perception by critics that he was not in touch with his readership. As he had been the leading literary voice of the civil rights movement, he became an inspirational figure for the emerging gay rights movement. His two novels written in the 1970s, If Beale Street Could Talk (1974) and Just Above My Head (1979), placed a strong emphasis on the importance of Black American families. He concluded his career by publishing a volume of poetry, Jimmy's Blues (1983), as well as another book-length essay, The Evidence of Things Not Seen (1985), an extended reflection on race inspired by the Atlanta murders of 1979–1981.

Saint-Paul-de-Vence 

Baldwin lived in France for most of his later life. He also spent some time in Switzerland and Turkey. Baldwin settled in Saint-Paul-de-Vence in the south of France in 1970, in an old Provençal house beneath the ramparts of the famous village. His house was always open to his friends who frequently visited him while on trips to the French Riviera. American painter Beauford Delaney made Baldwin's house in Saint-Paul-de-Vence his second home, often setting up his easel in the garden. Delaney painted several colorful portraits of Baldwin. Fred Nall Hollis also befriended Baldwin during this time. Actors Harry Belafonte and Sidney Poitier were also regular house guests.

Many of Baldwin's musician friends dropped in during the Jazz à Juan and Nice Jazz Festivals. They included Nina Simone, Josephine Baker (whose sister lived in Nice), Miles Davis, and Ray Charles. In his autobiography, Miles Davis wrote:

I'd read his books and I liked and respected what he had to say. As I got to know Jimmy we opened up to each other and became real great friends. Every time I went to southern France to play Antibes, I would always spend a day or two out at Jimmy's house in St. Paul de Vence. We'd just sit there in that great big beautiful house of his telling us all kinds of stories, lying our asses off.... He was a great man.

Baldwin learned to speak French fluently and developed friendships with French actor Yves Montand and French writer Marguerite Yourcenar who translated Baldwin's play The Amen Corner into French.

The years Baldwin spent in Saint-Paul-de-Vence were also years of work. Sitting in front of his sturdy typewriter, he devoted his days to writing and to answering the huge amount of mail he received from all over the world. He wrote several of his last works in his house in Saint-Paul-de-Vence, including Just Above My Head in 1979 and Evidence of Things Not Seen in 1985. It was also in his Saint-Paul-de-Vence house that Baldwin wrote his famous "Open Letter to My Sister, Angela Y. Davis" in November 1970.

Death

On December 1, 1987, Baldwin died from stomach cancer in Saint-Paul-de-Vence, France. He was buried at the Ferncliff Cemetery in Hartsdale, near New York City.

Fred Nall Hollis took care of Baldwin on his deathbed. Nall had been friends with Baldwin from the early 1970s when Baldwin would buy him drinks at the Café de Flore. Nall recalled talking to Baldwin shortly before his death about racism in Alabama. In one conversation, Nall told Baldwin "Through your books you liberated me from my guilt about being so bigoted coming from Alabama and because of my homosexuality." Baldwin insisted: "No, you liberated me in revealing this to me."

At the time of Baldwin's death, he was working on an unfinished manuscript called Remember This House, a memoir of his personal recollections of civil rights leaders Medgar Evers, Malcolm X and Martin Luther King Jr. Following his death, publishing company McGraw-Hill took the unprecedented step of suing his estate to recover the $200,000 advance they had paid him for the book, although the lawsuit was dropped by 1990. The manuscript forms the basis for Raoul Peck's 2016 documentary film I Am Not Your Negro.

Following Baldwin's death, a court battle began over the ownership of his home in France. Baldwin had been in the process of purchasing his house from his landlady, Mlle. Jeanne Faure. At the time of his death, Baldwin did not have full ownership of the home, although it was still Mlle. Faure's intention that the home would stay in the family. His home, nicknamed "Chez Baldwin", has been the center of scholarly work and artistic and political activism. The National Museum of African American History and Culture has an online exhibit titled "Chez Baldwin" which uses his historic French home as a lens to explore his life and legacy. Magdalena J. Zaborowska's 2018 book, Me and My House: James Baldwin's Last Decade in France, uses photographs of his home and his collections to discuss themes of politics, race, queerness, and domesticity.

Over the years, several efforts were initiated to save the house and convert it into an artist residency. None had the endorsement of the Baldwin estate. In February 2016, Le Monde published an opinion piece by Thomas Chatterton Williams, a contemporary Black American expatriate writer in France, which spurred a group of activists to come together in Paris. In June 2016, American writer and activist Shannon Cain squatted at the house for 10 days in an act of political and artistic protest. Les Amis de la Maison Baldwin, a French organization whose initial goal was to purchase the house by launching a capital campaign funded by the U.S. philanthropic sector, grew out of this effort. This campaign was unsuccessful without the support of the Baldwin Estate. Attempts to engage the French government in conservation of the property were dismissed by the mayor of Saint-Paul-de-Vence, Joseph Le Chapelain whose statement to the local press claiming "nobody's ever heard of James Baldwin" mirrored those of Henri Chambon, the owner of the corporation that razed his home. Construction was completed in 2019 on the apartment complex that now stands where Chez Baldwin once stood.

Themes

Struggle for self
In all of Baldwin's works, but particularly in his novels, the main characters are twined up in a "cage of reality" that sees them fighting for their soul against the limitations of the human condition or against their place at the margins of a society consumed by various prejudices. Baldwin connects many of his main characters—John in Go Tell It On The Mountain, Rufus in Another Country, Richard in Blues for Mister Charlie, and Giovanni in Giovanni's Room—as sharing a reality of restriction: per biographer David Leeming, each is "a symbolic cadaver in the center of the world depicted in the given novel and the larger society symbolized by that world". Each reaches for an identity within their own social environment, and sometimes—as in If Beale Street Could Talks Fonny and Tell me How Long The Train's Been Gones Leo—they find such an identity, imperfect but sufficient to bear the world. The singular theme in the attempts of Baldwin's characters to resolve their struggle for themselves is that such resolution only comes through love. Here is Leeming at some length:

Social and political activism 

Baldwin returned to the United States in the summer of 1957 while the civil rights legislation of that year was being debated in Congress. He had been powerfully moved by the image of a young girl, Dorothy Counts, braving a mob in an attempt to desegregate schools in Charlotte, North Carolina, and Partisan Review editor Philip Rahv had suggested he report on what was happening in the American South. Baldwin was nervous about the trip but he made it, interviewing people in Charlotte (where he met Martin Luther King Jr.), and Montgomery, Alabama. The result was two essays, one published in Harper's magazine ("The Hard Kind of Courage"), the other in Partisan Review ("Nobody Knows My Name"). Subsequent Baldwin articles on the movement appeared in Mademoiselle, Harper's, The New York Times Magazine, and The New Yorker, where in 1962 he published the essay that he called "Down at the Cross", and the New Yorker called "Letter from a Region of My Mind". Along with a shorter essay from The Progressive, the essay became The Fire Next Time.

While he wrote about the movement, Baldwin aligned himself with the ideals of the Congress of Racial Equality (CORE) and the Student Nonviolent Coordinating Committee (SNCC). Joining CORE gave him the opportunity to travel across the American South lecturing on his views of racial inequality. His insights into both the North and South gave him a unique perspective on the racial problems the United States was facing.

In 1963 he conducted a lecture tour of the South for CORE, traveling to Durham and Greensboro in North Carolina, and New Orleans. During the tour, he lectured to students, white liberals, and anyone else listening about his racial ideology, an ideological position between the "muscular approach" of Malcolm X and the nonviolent program of Martin Luther King, Jr. Baldwin expressed the hope that socialism would take root in the United States.

It is certain, in any case, that ignorance, allied with power, is the most ferocious enemy justice can have.
—James Baldwin

By the spring of 1963, the mainstream press began to recognize Baldwin's incisive analysis of white racism and his eloquent descriptions of the Negro's pain and frustration. In fact, Time featured Baldwin on the cover of its May 17, 1963, issue. "There is not another writer", said Time, "who expresses with such poignancy and abrasiveness the dark realities of the racial ferment in North and South."

In a cable Baldwin sent to Attorney General Robert F. Kennedy during the Birmingham, Alabama crisis, Baldwin blamed the violence in Birmingham on the FBI, J. Edgar Hoover, Mississippi Senator James Eastland, and President Kennedy for failing to use "the great prestige of his office as the moral forum which it can be." Attorney General Kennedy invited Baldwin to meet with him over breakfast, and that meeting was followed up with a second, when Kennedy met with Baldwin and others Baldwin had invited to Kennedy's Manhattan apartment. This meeting is discussed in Howard Simon's 1999 play, James Baldwin: A Soul on Fire. The delegation included Kenneth B. Clark, a psychologist who had played a key role in the Brown v. Board of Education decision; actor Harry Belafonte, singer Lena Horne, writer Lorraine Hansberry, and activists from civil rights organizations. Although most of the attendees of this meeting left feeling "devastated", the meeting was an important one in voicing the concerns of the civil rights movement, and it provided exposure of the civil rights issue not just as a political issue but also as a moral issue.

James Baldwin's FBI file contains 1,884 pages of documents, collected from 1960 until the early 1970s. During that era of surveillance of American writers, the FBI accumulated 276 pages on Richard Wright, 110 pages on Truman Capote, and just nine pages on Henry Miller.

Baldwin also made a prominent appearance at the March on Washington for Jobs and Freedom on August 28, 1963, with Belafonte and long-time friends Sidney Poitier and Marlon Brando.

Baldwin's sexuality clashed with his activism. The civil rights movement was hostile to homosexuals. The only out gay men in the movement were Baldwin and Bayard Rustin. Rustin and King were very close, as Rustin received credit for the success of the March on Washington. Many were bothered by Rustin's sexual orientation. King himself spoke on the topic of sexual orientation in a school editorial column during his college years, and in reply to a letter during the 1950s, where he treated it as a mental illness which an individual could overcome. King's key advisor, Stanley Levison, also stated that Baldwin and Rustin were "better qualified to lead a homo-sexual movement than a civil rights movement". The pressure later resulted in King distancing himself from both men. Despite his enormous efforts within the movement, due to his sexuality, Baldwin was excluded from the inner circles of the civil rights movement and was conspicuously uninvited to speak at the end of the March on Washington.

At the time, Baldwin was neither in the closet nor open to the public about his sexual orientation. Although his novels, specifically Giovanni's Room and Just Above My Head, had openly gay characters and relationships, Baldwin himself never openly stated his sexuality. In his book, Kevin Mumford points out how Baldwin went his life "passing as straight rather than confronting homophobes with whom he mobilized against racism".

After a bomb exploded in a Birmingham church three weeks after the March on Washington, Baldwin called for a nationwide campaign of civil disobedience in response to this "terrifying crisis". He traveled to Selma, Alabama, where SNCC had organized a voter registration drive; he watched mothers with babies and elderly men and women standing in long lines for hours, as armed deputies and state troopers stood by—or intervened to smash a reporter's camera or use cattle prods on SNCC workers. After his day of watching, he spoke in a crowded church, blaming Washington—"the good white people on the hill". Returning to Washington, he told a New York Post reporter the federal government could protect Negroes—it could send federal troops into the South. He blamed the Kennedys for not acting. In March 1965, Baldwin joined marchers who walked 50 miles from Selma, Alabama, to the capitol in Montgomery under the protection of federal troops.

Nonetheless, he rejected the label "civil rights activist", or that he had participated in a civil rights movement, instead agreeing with Malcolm X's assertion that if one is a citizen, one should not have to fight for one's civil rights. In a 1964 interview with Robert Penn Warren for the book Who Speaks for the Negro?, Baldwin rejected the idea that the civil rights movement was an outright revolution, instead calling it "a very peculiar revolution because it has to... have its aims the establishment of a union, and a... radical shift in the American mores, the American way of life... not only as it applies to the Negro obviously, but as it applies to every citizen of the country." In a 1979 speech at UC Berkeley, Baldwin called it, instead, "the latest slave rebellion".

In 1968, Baldwin signed the "Writers and Editors War Tax Protest" pledge, vowing to refuse to make income tax payments in protest against the Vietnam War.

Inspiration and relationships

A great influence on Baldwin was the painter Beauford Delaney. In The Price of the Ticket (1985), Baldwin describes Delaney as

... the first living proof, for me, that a black man could be an artist. In a warmer time, a less blasphemous place, he would have been recognized as my teacher and I as his pupil. He became, for me, an example of courage and integrity, humility and passion. An absolute integrity: I saw him shaken many times and I lived to see him broken but I never saw him bow.

Later support came from Richard Wright, whom Baldwin called "the greatest black writer in the world". Wright and Baldwin became friends, and Wright helped Baldwin secure the Eugene F. Saxon Memorial Award. Baldwin's essay "Notes of a Native Son" and his collection Notes of a Native Son allude to Wright's novel Native Son. In Baldwin's 1949 essay "Everybody's Protest Novel", however, he indicated that Native Son, like Harriet Beecher Stowe's Uncle Tom's Cabin, lacked credible characters and psychological complexity, and the friendship between the two authors ended. Interviewed by Julius Lester, however, Baldwin explained "I knew Richard and I loved him. I was not attacking him; I was trying to clarify something for myself." In 1965, Baldwin participated in a debate with William F. Buckley, on the topic of whether the American dream had been achieved at the expense of African Americans. The debate took place at Cambridge Union in the UK. The spectating student body voted overwhelmingly in Baldwin's favor.

In 1949 Baldwin met and fell in love with Lucien Happersberger, a boy aged 17, though Happersberger's marriage three years later left Baldwin distraught. When the marriage ended they later reconciled, with Happersberger staying by Baldwin's deathbed at his house in Saint-Paul-de-Vence. Happersberger died on August 21, 2010, in Switzerland.

Baldwin was a close friend of the singer, pianist, and civil rights activist Nina Simone. Langston Hughes, Lorraine Hansberry, and Baldwin helped Simone learn about the Civil Rights Movement. Baldwin also provided her with literary references influential on her later work. Baldwin and Hansberry met with Robert F. Kennedy, along with Kenneth Clark and Lena Horne and others in an attempt to persuade Kennedy of the importance of civil rights legislation.

Baldwin influenced the work of French painter Philippe Derome, whom he met in Paris in the early 1960s. Baldwin also knew Marlon Brando, Charlton Heston, Billy Dee Williams, Huey P. Newton, Nikki Giovanni, Jean-Paul Sartre, Jean Genet (with whom he campaigned on behalf of the Black Panther Party), Lee Strasberg, Elia Kazan, Rip Torn, Alex Haley, Miles Davis, Amiri Baraka, Martin Luther King, Jr., Dorothea Tanning, Leonor Fini, Margaret Mead, Josephine Baker, Allen Ginsberg, Chinua Achebe, and Maya Angelou. He wrote at length about his "political relationship" with Malcolm X. He collaborated with childhood friend Richard Avedon on the 1964 book Nothing Personal.

Maya Angelou called Baldwin her "friend and brother" and credited him for "setting the stage" for her 1969 autobiography I Know Why the Caged Bird Sings. Baldwin was made a Commandeur de la Légion d'Honneur by the French government in 1986.

Baldwin was also a close friend of Nobel Prize–winning novelist Toni Morrison. Upon his death, Morrison wrote a eulogy for Baldwin that appeared in The New York Times. In the eulogy, entitled "Life in His Language", Morrison credits Baldwin as being her literary inspiration and the person who showed her the true potential of writing. She writes:

Legacy and critical response
Literary critic Harold Bloom characterized Baldwin as "among the most considerable moral essayists in the United States".

Baldwin's influence on other writers has been profound: Toni Morrison edited the Library of America's first two volumes of Baldwin's fiction and essays: Early Novels & Stories (1998) and Collected Essays (1998). A third volume, Later Novels (2015), was edited by Darryl Pinckney, who had delivered a talk on Baldwin in February 2013 to celebrate the fiftieth anniversary of The New York Review of Books, during which he stated: "No other black writer I'd read was as literary as Baldwin in his early essays, not even Ralph Ellison. There is something wild in the beauty of Baldwin's sentences and the cool of his tone, something improbable, too, this meeting of Henry James, the Bible, and Harlem."

One of Baldwin's richest short stories, "Sonny's Blues", appears in many anthologies of short fiction used in introductory college literature classes.

A street in San Francisco, Baldwin Court in the Bayview neighborhood is named after Baldwin.

In 1987, Kevin Brown, a photo-journalist from Baltimore founded the National James Baldwin Literary Society. The group organizes free public events celebrating Baldwin's life and legacy.

In 1992, Hampshire College in Amherst, Massachusetts, established the James Baldwin Scholars program, an urban outreach initiative, in honor of Baldwin, who taught at Hampshire in the early 1980s. The JBS Program provides talented students of color from under-served communities an opportunity to develop and improve the skills necessary for college success through coursework and tutorial support for one transitional year, after which Baldwin scholars may apply for full matriculation to Hampshire or any other four-year college program.

Spike Lee's 1996 film Get on the Bus includes a Black gay character, played by Isaiah Washington, who punches a homophobic character, saying: "This is for James Baldwin and Langston Hughes."

His name appears in the lyrics of the Le Tigre song "Hot Topic", released in 1999.

In 2002, scholar Molefi Kete Asante included James Baldwin on his list of 100 Greatest African Americans.

In 2005, the United States Postal Service created a first-class postage stamp dedicated to Baldwin, which featured him on the front with a short biography on the back of the peeling paper.

In 2012, Baldwin was inducted into the Legacy Walk, an outdoor public display that celebrates LGBT history and people.

In 2014, East 128th Street, between Fifth and Madison Avenues was named "James Baldwin Place" to celebrate the 90th anniversary of Baldwin's birth. He lived in the neighborhood and attended P.S. 24. Readings of Baldwin's writing were held at The National Black Theatre and a month-long art exhibition featuring works by New York Live Arts and artist Maureen Kelleher. The events were attended by Council Member Inez Dickens, who led the campaign to honor Harlem native's son; also taking part were Baldwin's family, theatre and film notables, and members of the community.

Also in 2014, Baldwin was one of the inaugural honorees in the Rainbow Honor Walk, a walk of fame in San Francisco's Castro neighborhood celebrating LGBTQ people who have "made significant contributions in their fields."

Also in 2014, The Social Justice Hub at The New School's newly opened University Center was named the Baldwin Rivera Boggs Center after activists Baldwin, Sylvia Rivera, and Grace Lee Boggs.

In 2016, Raoul Peck released his documentary film I Am Not Your Negro. It is based on James Baldwin's unfinished manuscript, Remember This House. It is a 93-minute journey into Black history that connects the past of the Civil Rights Movement to the present of Black Lives Matter. It is a film that questions Black representation in Hollywood and beyond.

In 2017, Scott Timberg wrote an essay for the Los Angeles Times ("30 years after his death, James Baldwin is having a new pop culture moment") in which he noted existing cultural references to Baldwin, 30 years after his death, and concluded: "So Baldwin is not just a writer for the ages, but a scribe whose work—as squarely as George Orwell's—speaks directly to ours."

In June 2019 Baldwin's residence on the Upper West Side was given landmark designation by New York City's Landmarks Preservation Commission.

In June 2019, Baldwin was one of the inaugural fifty American "pioneers, trailblazers, and heroes" inducted on the National LGBTQ Wall of Honor within the Stonewall National Monument (SNM) in New York City's Stonewall Inn. The SNM is the first U.S. national monument dedicated to LGBTQ rights and history, and the wall's unveiling was timed to take place during the 50th anniversary of the Stonewall riots.

At the Paris Council of June 2019, the city of Paris voted unanimously by all political groups to name a place in the capital in the name of James Baldwin. The project was confirmed on June 19, 2019, and announced for the year 2020. In 2021, Paris City Hall announced that the writer would give his name to the very first media library in the 19th arrondissement, which is scheduled to open in 2023.

Honors and awards
Guggenheim Fellowship, 1954. 
Eugene F. Saxton Memorial Trust Award
Foreign Drama Critics Award
George Polk Memorial Award, 1963
MacDowell fellowships: 1954, 1958, 1960
Commandeur de la Légion d'honneur, 1986

Works

Novels 
1953. Go Tell It on the Mountain (semi-autobiographical)
1956. Giovanni's Room
1962. Another Country
1968. Tell Me How Long the Train's Been Gone
1974. If Beale Street Could Talk
1979. Just Above My Head
1956. Sonny's Blues

Essays and short stories 
Many essays and short stories by Baldwin were published for the first time as part of collections (e.g. Notes of a Native Son). Others, however, were published individually at first and later included with Baldwin's compilation books. Some essays and stories of Baldwin's that were originally released on their own include:

 1949. "Everybody's Protest Novel". Partisan Review (June issue)
 1953. "Stranger in the Village". Harper's Magazine.
 1954. "Gide as Husband and Homosexual". The New Leader.
 1956. "Faulkner and Desegregation". Partisan Review.
 1957. "Sonny's Blues". Partisan Review.
 1957. "Princes and Powers". Encounter.
 1958. "The Hard Kind of Courage". Harper's Magazine.
 1959. "The Discovery of What It Means to Be an American". The New York Times Book Review.
 1959. "Nobody Knows My Name: A Letter from the South". Partisan Review.
 1960. "Fifth Avenue, Uptown: A Letter from Harlem". Esquire.
 1960. "The Precarious Vogue of Ingmar Bergman". Esquire.
 1961. "A Negro Assays the Negro Mood". New York Times Magazine.
 1961. "The Survival of Richard Wright". Reporter.
 1961. "Richard Wright". Encounter.
 1962. "Letter from a Region of My Mind". The New Yorker.
 1962. "My Dungeon Shook". The Progressive.
 1963. "A Talk to Teachers"
 1967. "Negroes Are Anti-Semitic Because They're Anti-White". New York Times Magazine.
 1976. The Devil Finds Work — a book-length essay published by Dial Press.

Collections 
Many essays and short stories by Baldwin were published for the first time as part of collections, which also included older, individually-published works (such as above) of Baldwin's as well. These collections include:
 1955. Notes of a Native Son
 1961. Nobody Knows My Name: More Notes of a Native Son
 1963. The Fire Next Time
 1965. Going to Meet the Man
 1972. No Name in the Street
 1983. Jimmy's Blues
 1985. The Evidence of Things Not Seen
 1985. The Price of the Ticket
 2010. The Cross of Redemption: Uncollected Writings.

Plays and audio 
 1954 The Amen Corner (play)
1964. Blues for Mister Charlie (play)
1990. A Lover's Question (album). Les Disques Du Crépuscule – TWI 928–2.

Collaborative works 
 1964. Nothing Personal, with Richard Avedon (photography)
 1971. A Rap on Race, with Margaret Mead
 1971. A Passenger from the West, narrative with Baldwin conversations, by Nabile Farès; appended with long-lost interview.
 1972. One Day When I Was Lost (orig.: A. Haley)
 1973. A Dialogue, with Nikki Giovanni
 1976. Little Man Little Man: A Story of Childhood, with Yoran Cazac
 2004. Native Sons, with Sol Stein

Posthumous collections
 1998. Early Novels & Stories: Go Tell It on the Mountain, Giovanni's Room, Another Country, Going to Meet the Man, edited by Toni Morrison.
 1998. Collected Essays: Notes of a Native Son, Nobody Knows My Name, The Fire Next Time, No Name in the Street, The Devil Finds Work, Other Essays, edited by Toni Morrison.
 2014. Jimmy's Blues and Other Poems.
 2015. Later Novels: Tell Me How Long the Train's Been Gone, If Beale Street Could Talk, Just Above My Head, edited by Darryl Pinckney.
 2016. Baldwin for Our Times: Writings from James Baldwin for an Age of Sorrow and Struggle, with notes and introduction by Rich Blint.

Media appearances

 1963-06-24. "A Conversation With James Baldwin", is a television interview recorded by WGBH following the Baldwin–Kennedy meeting.
 1963-02-04. Take This Hammer is a television documentary made with Richard O. Moore on KQED about Blacks in San Francisco in the late 1950s.
 1965-06-14. "Debate: Baldwin vs. Buckley", recorded by the BBC is a one-hour television special program featuring a debate between Baldwin and leading American conservative William F. Buckley, Jr., at the Cambridge Union, Cambridge University, England.
 1971. Meeting the Man: James Baldwin in Paris. Documentary. Directed by	Terence Dixon.
 1974. James Baldwin talks about race, political struggle, and the human condition at the Wheeler Hall, Berkeley, CA.
 1975. "Assignment America; 119; Conversation with a Native Son", from WNET features a television conversation between Baldwin and Maya Angelou.
 1976. "Pantechnicon; James Baldwin", is a radio program recorded by WGBH. Baldwin discusses his new book called The Devil Finds Work which is representative of the way Baldwin takes a look at the American films and myth.

See also
LGBT culture in New York City
 List of civil rights leaders
 List of American novelists
 List of LGBT writers
 List of LGBT people from New York City

Notes

References

Sources

Further reading

Archival resources
 James Baldwin early manuscripts and papers, 1941–1945  (2.7 linear feet) are housed at Yale University Beinecke Library
 James Baldwin Papers, Manuscripts, Archives and Rare Books Division, Schomburg Center for Research in Black Culture, the New York Public Library (30.4 linear feet).
 Gerstner, David A. Queer Pollen: White Seduction, Black Male Homosexuality, and the Cinematic. University of Illinois Press, 2011. Chapter 2.
 Letters to David Moses at the Stuart A. Rose Manuscript, Archives, and Rare Book Library
 James Baldwin Playboy Interview, archival materials held by Princeton University Library Special Collections

External links

 "A Conversation With James Baldwin", 1963-06-24, WGBH
 Transcript of interview with Dr. Kenneth Clark
 
 
 
 Altman, Elias, "Watered Whiskey: James Baldwin's Uncollected Writings", The Nation, April 13, 2011.
 
 Gwin, Minrose. "Southernspaces.org" March 11, 2008. Southern Spaces.
 James Baldwin talks about race, political struggle and the human condition  at the Wheeler Hall, Berkeley, CA, in 1974
 James Baldwin Photographs and Papers, selected manuscripts, correspondence, and photographic portraits from the Beinecke Rare Book and Manuscript Library at Yale University
 
 James Baldwin: The Price of the Ticket, distributed by California Newsreel
 Baldwin's American Masters page
 "Writings of James Baldwin" from C-SPAN's American Writers: A Journey Through History
 Zaborowska, Magdalena J., "James Baldwin", The Literary Encyclopedia, October 25, 2002.
 Audio files of speeches and interviews at UC Berkeley
 See Baldwin's 1963 film Take This Hammer, made with Richard O. Moore, about Blacks in San Francisco in the late 1950s.
 Video: Baldwin debate with William F. Buckley (via UC Berkeley Media Resources Center)
 
 Guardian Books "Author Page", with profile and links to further articles
 The James Baldwin Collective in Paris, France
 FBI files on James Baldwin
 FBI Docs, contains information about James Baldwin's destroyed FBI files and FBI files about him held by the National Archives
 A Look Inside James Baldwin's 1,884 Page FBI File
 James Baldwin at Biography.com
 Portrait of James Baldwin, 1964. Los Angeles Times Photographic Archive (Collection 1429). UCLA Library Special Collections, Charles E. Young Research Library, University of California, Los Angeles. 
 Portrait of James Baldwin, 1985. Los Angeles Times Photographic Archive (Collection 1429). UCLA Library Special Collections, Charles E. Young Research Library, University of California, Los Angeles.

1924 births
1987 deaths
20th-century African-American writers
20th-century American dramatists and playwrights
20th-century American essayists
20th-century American male writers
20th-century American novelists
20th-century American poets
20th-century American short story writers
20th-century scholars
20th-century American LGBT people
Activists from New York (state)
African-American academics
African-American atheists
African-American dramatists and playwrights
African-American novelists
African-American poets
African-American short story writers
American atheists
American expatriates in France
American gay writers
American LGBT poets
American LGBT dramatists and playwrights
American LGBT novelists
American male dramatists and playwrights
American male essayists
American male non-fiction writers
American male novelists
American male poets
American male short story writers
American socialists
American tax resisters
Amherst College faculty
Burials at Ferncliff Cemetery
Deaths from cancer in France
Deaths from stomach cancer
DeWitt Clinton High School alumni
Gay dramatists and playwrights
Gay novelists
Gay poets
George Polk Award recipients
Hampshire College faculty
LGBT African Americans
LGBT people from New York (state)
MacDowell Colony fellows 
Members of the American Academy of Arts and Letters
New York (state) socialists
Novelists from New York (state)
People from Harlem
Postmodern writers
The New Yorker people
The Nation (U.S. magazine) people
Writers from Manhattan
Yaddo alumni